Borkowo Małe  is a settlement in the administrative district of Gmina Radowo Małe, within Łobez County, West Pomeranian Voivodeship, in north-western Poland.

References

Villages in Łobez County